Daultan Sultan Khanum was a princess of the Chagatai Khanate as a daughter of Yunus Khan, the Great Khan of Moghulistan and his second wife Shah Begum. She was also the step aunt of Emperor Babur, the founder of the Mughal Empire of India as well as its first Emperor.

Biography
Her paternal grandfather was Uwais Khan, the Moghul Khan of Mughalistan and her father's predecessor. Daulat Sultan was a direct descendant of Genghis Khan, the founder and Great Khan (Emperor) of the Mongol Empire through her father's side. Being the daughter of a Khan, Daulat Sultan held the title of "Khanum" ("daughter of a Khan or princess") by birth.

She was the wife by chance of battle of Timur Sultan Uzbek. She had a daughter by him. In 1501–02 she was in Tashkand, and Qutlugh Nigar Khanum went to visit her after thirteen or fourteen years of separation. Babur, dejected and an exile, joined the family party in the next year. In 1503 Shaibam sacked Tashkand and forcibly married Daulat Sultan to his son Timur. She bore him a daughter, and she remained in his harem until Babur took possession of Samarkand in 1511, and she joined him. She went south with him in 1513, and remained several years in Badakhshan with another nephew, Mirza Wais Khan who behaved to her like a son.

Another nephew, Sa'id, her own brother Ahmad's son, then invited her, with costly gifts, to visit him in Kashghar. She made the long and difficult journey, joined him in Yarkand, and with him she spent the rest of her life. Babur mentions that her foster brother brought him news and letters from her on September 8, 1519). In the same year Mansur, Sa'id's eldest brother, went to Kashghar to visit her, his "beloved aunt."

The Persian text of the Tarikh-i-rashidi says that Mansur went so that by looking at her kind face his grief for the loss of his father might be mitigated. The Bible Society's Turk! version reads: "Being prompted there to by the extreme warmth of his affection for her." Both statements illumine her character. The second seems the more appropriate, since the death of Sultan Ahmad Khan took place in 1503 and Mansur's visit in 1520.

References

External links
THE MEMOIRS OF BABUR

1538 deaths
Turkic female royalty
Moghulistan
16th-century Turkic women